Downtown Saint Paul is the central business district of Saint Paul, Minnesota, United States. Its boundaries are the Mississippi River to the south, University Avenue to the north, US 52 to the east, and Kellogg Avenue to the west. It is bounded by the Dayton's Bluff, Summit-University, West Seventh, Frogtown, West Side, and Payne-Phalen neighborhoods. The West Side neighborhood is on the other side of the river, and can be accessed via the Robert Street Bridge or the Wabasha Street Bridge. Interstate 35E and Interstate 94 run through the north side of the neighborhood, providing a separation between the Minnesota State Capitol and other state government buildings with the rest of downtown.

Government
The Minnesota State Capitol is located on the northern fringe of the downtown neighborhood. Work began on the current capitol in 1896, and construction was completed in 1905. The early 1950s saw the development of the expansive mall that currently surrounds the capitol. This development required the demolition of many homes, apartments, churches, and businesses, and paved the way for the construction of four government agency buildings surrounding the mall: Veteran Services Building, the Transportation Building, the Centennial Office Building, and the National Guard Armory. Saint Paul City Hall and Ramsey County Courthouse is also located downtown.

Economy
A number of corporations and institutions are located in downtown Saint Paul. Since 1933, Ecolab has maintained its headquarters in downtown. In 1989 Twin Cities PBS relocated to its current location in downtown In 1997 the Minnesota State Colleges and Universities System moved its headquartered in the Wells Fargo Place. Minnesota Public Radio purchased its current downtown headquarters in 2001 from the Public Housing Agency of St. Paul. In 2005 Gander Mountain relocated to downtown. Securian Financial Group is located in the Securian Center and is the largest private employer in downtown with 2,600 employees. Travelers Insurance maintains a large presence downtown, employing 2,000 people. In 2009 supercomputer manufacturer Cray Inc. relocated to become the anchor tenant of the Cray Plaza in downtown.

Lowertown

The Lowertown Historic District is a historic district on the east-side of Downtown Saint Paul. This 16-block warehouse and wholesaling district comprises 37 contributing properties built 1870s–1920. It was listed on the National Register of Historic Places in 1983 for the significance of its river and rail connections, economic impact, architecture, and urban planning. In recent years Lowertown has been undergoing changes from a bohemian, artist-community into a gentrified neighborhood filled with coffee shops, restaurants, bars, breweries, and market-rate apartments.

Lowertown is the home of the Saint Paul Union Depot, a historic railroad station that is still in use as a transportation hub for Amtrak, Greyhound Lines and the Metro Green Line.

Parks
Downtown has three city parks, two of which predate Minnesota statehood. The land for both Mears Park and Rice Park was donated to the city of Saint Paul in 1849. Both parks have gone through numerous renovations and host several festivals throughout the year. Rice Park most notably hosts the Saint Paul Winter Carnival which is the oldest winter carnival in the country, having operated since 1886. Since 1999, Mears Park has hosted the Twin Cities Jazz Festival.

Culture

The Saint Paul Public Library system operates the Central Library, which has been on the National Register of Historic Places since 1975. James J. Hill Reference Library is located within the Central Library. The Landmark Center is located on the north side of Rice Park.

Theater & performing arts
Palace Theatre
Ordway Center for the Performing Arts
Roy Wilkins Auditorium
Fitzgerald Theater
Saint Paul Chamber Orchestra

Museums
Minnesota Children's Museum
Minnesota Museum of American Art
Minnesota History Center
Science Museum of Minnesota

Sports
In September 2000 the Xcel Energy Center opened in downtown to serve as the home for the  Minnesota Wild. Apart from hosting the Wild, the Xcel Energy Center has hosted the U.S. Figure Skating Championships, the NCAA Men's Ice Hockey Championship, the Minnesota State High School League Boys’ Hockey Tournament, the WNBA's Minnesota Lynx, and the now defunct National Lacrosse League team Minnesota Swarm.

Located in the Lowertown District of downtown, CHS Field opened in May 2015 at a cost of $63 million. CHS field serves as home field for the Saint Paul Saints of the American Association of Independent Professional Baseball and despite not having an affiliation with a Major League Baseball team, an average of 8,438 fans visited CHS Field to watch the Saints, which was the seventh-highest average attendance across minor league baseball.

The Saints' move from Midway Stadium to CHS Field marks the return of baseball to downtown since the St. Paul Saints of the American Association played their games at The Pillbox from 1903-1909. The Pillbox, or Downtown Stadium, was located on the current site of the Metro Green Line Robert Street station between 12th and 13th Streets.

In January 2018 TRIA Rink opened on the top floor of the former Macy's building since renamed Treasure Island Center. TRIA Rink is the practice facility for the Minnesota Wild and the home arena for the Minnesota Whitecaps of the National Women's Hockey League and Hamline University's hockey program.

Since 2011, downtown has played host for the Red Bull Crashed Ice event. Crashed Ice is a winter extreme sporting event featuring ice cross downhill (or downhill ice cross) which involves downhill skating in an urban environment, on a track which includes steep turns and high vertical drops. The event coincides with the Saint Paul Winter Carnival and draws crowds of more than 100,000.

Transportation

The neighborhood is served by five stops along the METRO Green Line light rail system.
Capitol/Rice Street
Robert Street station
10th Street station
Central station
Union Depot station

Skyway
Similar to its twin city, Minneapolis, Downtown Saint Paul has a skyway system consisting of 40 bridges that link most of the buildings along Kellogg Boulevard with the midcentury office core. The skyway is open seven days a week from 6 a.m. to 2 a.m., however businesses in the skyway are generally closed at 6 p.m. and on the weekends. Prominent buildings connected to the skyway include:

Cray Plaza
Hamm Building
First National Bank Building
Minnesota Building
Wells Fargo Place

Education

Primary and secondary
Saint Paul Preparatory School
Creative Arts Senior High School
Saint Paul Conservatory for the Performing Artists

Higher Education
College of St. Scholastica - Satellite location
McNally Smith College of Music * McNally Smith College of Music has closed.

References

Neighborhoods in Saint Paul, Minnesota
Minnesota populated places on the Mississippi River
Saint Paul